Villa Maria is an unincorporated community in Lawrence County, Pennsylvania, United States. The community, which is located near the Ohio border, is a religious community and farm complex for the Sisters of the Holy Humility of Mary. Villa Maria has a post office with ZIP code 16155, which opened on January 21, 1889.

References

External links
Villa Maria Education and Spirituality Center

Unincorporated communities in Lawrence County, Pennsylvania
Unincorporated communities in Pennsylvania